Raver Assembly constituency is one of the 288 Vidhan Sabha (Legislative Assembly) constituencies of Maharashtra state in western India. This constituency is located in the Jalgaon district.

Raver is part of the Raver Lok Sabha constituency along with five other Vidhan Sabha segments, namely Bhusawal, Chopda, Muktainagar and Jamner in Jalgaon district and Malkapur in adjoining Buldhana district.

Elections Results

2019

Members of Legislative Assembly

 
 Raver was part of Bombay state during 1951 and 1957 elections

See also
 Raver (Lok Sabha constituency)

References

Assembly constituencies of Maharashtra
Jalgaon district